Karen Ann Panetta is an American computer engineer and inventor who is a professor and Dean of Graduate Education at Tufts University. Her research considers machine learning and automated systems. She is a Fellow of the Institute of Electrical and Electronics Engineers, the American Institute of Aeronautics and Astronautics and the National Academy of Inventors.

Early life and education 
Panetta became interested in engineering as a child. She was an undergraduate student at Boston University. She majored in computer engineering before moving to Northeastern University for her master's degree in electrical engineering. Panetta remained at Northeastern for her doctoral studies, working on information systems and robotics.

Research and career 
In 1994, Panetta joined Tufts University School of Engineering, where she became the first woman to be awarded tenure. Panetta develops signal and image processing algorithms. She is particularly interested in approaches for robot vision and biomedical imaging.

Panetta created an autonomous software that can benefit medical diagnostics. Amongst the pieces of software developed by Panetta, she created a piece that can identify pneumonia caused by COVID-19, and another that can provide detailed information to dentists about areas of the mouth that need attention.

Academic service 
Panetta is committed to improving the representation of women in engineering. She was appointed the worldwide director for the Institute of Electrical and Electronics Engineers (IEEE) Women in Engineering program and editor-in-chief of the Women in Engineering magazine. In 1999, Panetta founded Nerd Girls, a platform dedicated to challenging stereotypes about women scientists. She is the co-author of Count Girls In, a book for families that looks to encourage parents to raise authentic young women.

Awards and honors 
 2011 Anita Borg Institute Women of Vision Award
 2012 Presidential Award for Excellence in Science, Mathematics, and Engineering Mentoring
 2013 William E. Sayle II Award for Achievement in Education
 2013 IEEE Award for Distinguished Ethical Practices
 2020 IEEE-USA Award for Distinguished Literary Contributions Furthering Public Understanding and the Advancement of the Engineering Profession
 2021 Elected to the National Academy of Inventors

Selected publications

References 

American women computer scientists
American women engineers
American inventors
Women inventors
Tufts University faculty
Living people
Year of birth missing (living people)